"Longing" is a ballad by Japanese heavy metal band X Japan and written by Yoshiki. The song has been released in several versions, most notably in two different single variations. The first, was released as their eleventh single on August 1, 1995 and reached the number 1 spot on the Oricon chart. The second, is their twelfth released on December 11, 1995 and reached number 5.

Summary
The song was first released as a demo tape titled "Longing ~Togireta Melody~", which was given out at X Japan's December 30–31, 1994 Tokyo Dome concerts. The demo also included a recording of the band practicing "Longing", "Break the Darkness", "Scars" and "Dahlia". In 2007, this demo tape was re-released on CD in the Aoi Yoru Shiroi Yoru Complete Edition, a DVD set of the two concerts where it was first released.

The first single of the song, released on August 1, 1995, is very similar to the demo and as such shares the same name. Although it is nearly a minute longer and includes drums, which the demo lacked. This is the version of the song that was included on the album, Dahlia. Released on December 11, 1995, the second single "Longing ~Setsubou no Yoru~", only includes Toshi's vocals and a symphony, and is much more melancholic than the other. This single's third track is an English version of the song, where, instead of Toshi singing, Yoshiki reads the lyrics as one would a poem.

David Lynch directed a television commercial to promote "Togireta Melody". Shot on a beach in Malibu, it only features Yoshiki. He also created a music video for "Setsubou no Yoru", that was recorded in a Los Angeles studio and at Coyote Dry Lake, though it has never been released. In his 2018 autobiography, Lynch described the experience as "really fun" and said "Some of the frames are so fuckin' beautiful you can't believe it." Behind the scenes footage of the making of these videos is included in the 2016 We Are X documentary.

A live performance of the "Togireta Melody" version was included as a B-side of the 1997 "Forever Love (Last Mix)" single, titled "Longing (Bootleg)" due to the poor audio quality of the recording. Yoshiki would create another orchestrated instrumental version of the song, simply titled "Longing", for his 2005 solo album Eternal Melody II.

Commercial performance
The first single "Longing ~Togireta Melody~" reached number 1 on the Oricon charts, and charted for 11 weeks. In 1995, with 476,170 copies sold it was the 76th best-selling single of the year, being certified Platinum by RIAJ. The second single, "Longing ~Setsubou no Yoru~", reached number 5 on the chart and charted for 7 weeks.

Track listing

Personnel

"Longing ~Togireta Melody~"
Co-Producer – X Japan
Orchestra arranged by – Yoshiki, Dick Marx, Shelly Berg
Scored by – Tom Halm
Mixed by – Mike Shipley
Recorded by – Rich Breen, Mike Ging
Assistant engineers – Tal Miller, Mike Stock, Cappy Japngie, Richard Landers
Mastered by – Stephen Marcussen (Precision Studio)
A&R Directed by – Hiro Inoguchi, Yoshinobu Toida
Art direction and design – Mitsuo Izumisawa
Executive producers – Ryuzo "Jr." Kosugi, Takashi Kamide, Sekiji Murata, Yukitaka Mashimo

"Longing ~Setsubou no Yoru~"
Co-Producer – X Japan
Orchestra arranged by – Yoshiki, Dick Marx, Shelly Berg
Scored by – Tom Halm
Sound effects by – Yoshiki, Toshi
Mixed by – Rich Breen (tracks 1 & 2), Mike Ging (track 3)
Recorded by – Rich Breen, Mike Ging
Assistant engineers – Tal Miller, Cappy Japngie, Richard Landers
Mastered by – Stephen Marcussen (Precision Studio)
A&R Directed by – Yoshinobu Toida, Hiro Inoguchi
Executive producers – Ryuzo "Jr." Kosugi, Takashi Kamide, Sekiji Murata, Yukitaka Mashimo
Art direction and design – Shige "#11" Komai
Flower photography – Hajime Kuroda

References

X Japan songs
Songs written by Yoshiki (musician)
Oricon Weekly number-one singles
Heavy metal ballads
1994 songs
1995 singles
Japanese-language songs
Torch songs
1990s ballads